James Wilson (April 9, 1825 – August 8, 1867) was a United States representative from Indiana. He and his wife, Emma (Ingersoll) Wilson (daughter of Stephen Ingersoll and Hannah Elizabeth Bullard, sister to Lurton Dunham Ingersoll, were the parents of John Lockwood Wilson, Howard Wilson and Henry Lane Wilson.

Biography
James Wilson was born in Crawfordsville, Indiana, in 1825. He graduated from Wabash College in Crawfordsville in 1842 at the age of 17. In 1845, he graduated from Indiana University in Bloomington, Indiana, with a degree in law.

Mexican-American War
Wilson served in the United States military during the Mexican–American War from June 17, 1846, to June 16, 1847.

Political career 
After he turned to Crawfordsville in 1847, Wilson worked in the law office of Tilghman Howard (later the namesake of one of his sons), and he was admitted to the bar in 1848. Wilson became actively involved in politics in the mid-1850s, and he was a member of the newly formed Republican Party. In 1856, Wilson decided to run for the seat of 8th District Indiana Representative. During the election, Wilson defeated Daniel Wolsey Voorhees, and Wilson officially became a member of Congress on March 4, 1857. During the congressional election of 1858, Wilson was reelected. Wilson's time in Congress came to an end on March 3, 1861. He had served in the Thirty-Fifth and Thirty-Sixth Congresses of the United States of America.

Civil War 
During the American Civil War, Wilson was appointed captain of Volunteers on November 26, 1862. He was honorably discharged from the military on December 6, 1865, with the rank of brevet lieutenant colonel. At the end of the war, Wilson returned to his law practice in Crawfordsville.

Later career and death 
In 1866, President Andrew Johnson appointed Wilson to the position of Minister Resident to Venezuela. He served in this capacity from 1866 until his death in Caracas, Venezuela, on August 8, 1867. Wilson is buried in Oak Hill Cemetery, Crawfordsville, Indiana.

References
 Retrieved on 2009-04-20

External links
 James Wilson Bio and Speeches at Crawfordsville District Public Library

1825 births
1867 deaths
American military personnel of the Mexican–American War
Union Army officers
19th-century American diplomats
People of Indiana in the American Civil War
People from Indiana in the Mexican–American War
Wabash College alumni
Ambassadors of the United States to Venezuela
19th-century American politicians
Republican Party members of the United States House of Representatives from Indiana